Deuel may refer to:
Reuel (name)

People 
Corey Deuel (born 1977), American pocket billiards player
Geoffrey Deuel (born 1943), American actor
Harry P. Deuel (1836–1914), prominent railroad man
Patrick Deuel (1962–2016)
Pete Duel (1940–1971), born Peter Ellstrom Deuel

Place 
Deuel County (disambiguation)

Other 
 Deuel Vocational Institution, a state prison located in San Joaquin County, California
USS Deuel (APA-160)